Hello Sunshine may refer to:
 "Hello Sunshine" (Super Furry Animals song)
 "Hello Sunshine" (Bruce Springsteen song)
 Hello Sunshine (book), a collection of poems and short stories by Ryan Adams
 Hello Sunshine (company), an American media company founded by actress Reese Witherspoon